Cuss may refer to:

 Cambridge University Socialist Society
 Common Use Self Service, a standard for airport check-in kiosks.
 Profanity